Mauve is the second studio album by American shoegaze band Ringo Deathstarr. It was released on September 19, 2012, by Vinyl Junkie Recordings in Japan, and on September 24, 2012, by Club AC30 in the UK and Sonic Unyon in North America.

Track listing

References

2012 albums
Ringo Deathstarr albums
Sonic Unyon Records albums